Bulgaria competed at the 2020 Summer Paralympics in Tokyo, Japan, from 24 August to 5 September 2021.

Medalists

Athletics 

Two Bulgarian male athlete, Hristiyan Stoyanov (1500m T46) & Ruzhdi Ruzhdi (Shot Put F55), successfully to break through the qualifications for the 2020 Paralympics after breaking the qualification limit.

Men's track

Men's field

Women's field

Shooting

Bulgaria entered one athletes into the Paralympic competition. Milena Todorova successfully break the Paralympic qualification at the 2018 WSPS World Championships which was held in Cheongju, South Korea.

References 

Nations at the 2020 Summer Paralympics
2020
2021 in Bulgarian sport